Jonathan Francisco Lemos (born 25 August 1992), simply known as Jonathan, is a Brazilian footballer who plays as a right back for Bahia.

Club career
Born in Brasília, Distrito Federal, Jonathan finished his formation with hometown club Brasiliense. On 14 August 2010 he made his first team debut, starting in a 2–2 home draw against Guaratinguetá for the Série B championship.

In 2013 Jonathan moved to Capivariano, after a brief stint at XV de Piracicaba. On 10 July 2013 he was loaned to Comercial-SP, appearing with the side in that year's Copa Paulista.

In the 2014 summer Jonathan signed for Ponte Preta, but after failing to make an appearance for the side during the year, moved to Água Santa on 11 December.

On 19 May 2015 Jonathan joined Portuguesa, on loan until the end of the year.

Honours
Botafogo
Campeonato Brasileiro Série B: 2021

References

External links

1992 births
Living people
Footballers from Brasília
Brazilian footballers
Association football defenders
Campeonato Brasileiro Série A players
Campeonato Brasileiro Série B players
Campeonato Brasileiro Série C players
Brasiliense Futebol Clube players
Esporte Clube XV de Novembro (Piracicaba) players
Capivariano Futebol Clube players
Comercial Futebol Clube (Ribeirão Preto) players
Associação Atlética Ponte Preta players
Associação Portuguesa de Desportos players
Atlético Clube Goianiense players
Coritiba Foot Ball Club players
Botafogo de Futebol e Regatas players
Esporte Clube Bahia players